The Female Spectator, published by Eliza Haywood between 1744 and 1746, is generally considered to be the first periodical in English written by women for women.

Publication
The Female Spectator was launched anonymously in April 1744 and was published on a monthly basis. It eventually ran for 24 numbers, a longer run than most periodicals of the time.

Audience and reception
The primary audience for Haywood's journal was women – the newly affluent middle classes, and the upper strata with leisure time and money. She wrote that she wanted the periodical to be "as universally read as possible", and a poem by an anonymous male author in The Gentleman's Magazine in December 1944 praising the The Female Spectator suggests that it was indeed read by at least some men.

Contents
The Female Spectator is loosely modelled on The Spectator by Joseph Addison and Richard Steele. The new publication differs from its inspiration principally in that it speaks exclusively from a female viewpoint. To do this it employs four characters: the eponymous "Female Spectator," who shares the benefits of her lifetime experience, and her three assistants, each of whom represents an idealized woman at a different stage of life:  Euphrosine, the beautiful unmarried daughter of a wealthy merchant; the happily married and sophisticated Mira; and a "Widow of Quality."

Each issue of the journal was originally published in book format and usually covers a single topic or narrative in the form of essays or stories  which frequently revolve around "love and marriage", with an emphasis on moral attitudes. The essays use a straightforward structure of premise, development, and conclusion, with few digressions. The sentences are leisurely and well-balanced, with simple but forceful language.

The explicit moral instruction is bolstered with exemplary or cautionary anecdotes that demonstrate an "appropriate" point of view of different situations and warn of the consequences of risky behaviours. One such anecdote features a young woman who disguises herself as a boy in order to follow her lover into the army; another tells of a young woman, raised in ignorance, who elopes with the first man to court her; and a third describes a woman, dissatisfied with marriage, whose love affair yields an illegitimate child. Over the run of the journal such stories numbered sixty, some detailed enough to be likened to "miniature novels".

Haywood defended the omission of current affairs by pointing out these were adequately represented in the newspapers of the day. She also argued the need for women to be more widely educated. She devoted one series of issues, for example, to the study of Baconian empiricism and the natural world and by so doing is said to have fostered women's interest in the microscope.

See also
 List of 18th-century British periodicals
 List of 18th-century British periodicals for women

References

External sites
 The Female Spectator archives at the Internet Archive
 

1744 establishments in England
1746 disestablishments in England
Defunct magazines published in the United Kingdom
Magazines published in England
Magazines established in 1744
Magazines disestablished in 1746
Magazines published in London
News magazines published in the United Kingdom
Defunct women's magazines published in the United Kingdom
Monthly magazines published in the United Kingdom